Giorgio Siani (born 9 January 1997) is an Italian footballer who plays mainly as a winger for Fanfulla.

Career

Early career 
Siani was born in Milan in 1997, and began his career in the youth team of Serie A side Atalanta, located in Lombardy. He made a loan move to Varese before being signed to the youth teams of Serie A giants Juventus upon his return to Bergamo. He was loaned back to Atalanta and then on to Carpi for 6 months in 2016.

Tuttocuoio 
Once he had returned from his loan to Carpi, Siani signed on loan to Lega Pro side Tuttocuoio for one year. He was an unused substitute in the 3–2 Coppa Italia loss to Casertana. His debut in the league on 9 October 2016, coming on as a substitute in a 1–4 loss to Alessandria, playing the final 14 minutes. His first goal for the club came in the last-16 stage of the Coppa Italia Lega Pro on 23 November 2016, when he started and scored twice in an eventual 3–1 win over Pontedera as Tuttocuoio progressed.

Serie D 
On 10 September 2019, he joined Serie D club Savona.

Piacenza 
On 7 August 2020 he moved to Serie C club Piacenza.

Back to Serie D
On 5 January 2021, he signed with Serie D club Caronnese.

References

External links

1997 births
Footballers from Milan
Living people
Italian footballers
Italian expatriate footballers
Association football forwards
A.C. Tuttocuoio 1957 San Miniato players
FC Den Bosch players
Ravenna F.C. players
Savona F.B.C. players
Piacenza Calcio 1919 players
Serie C players
Serie D players
Eerste Divisie players
Italian expatriate sportspeople in the Netherlands
Expatriate footballers in the Netherlands
S.C. Caronnese S.S.D. players